Tananam Tananam is a 2006 Indian Kannada-language romantic musical film directed and written by Kavitha Lankesh. The film has Ramya and Rakshita teaming up together for the first time, and introduces  Shaam, a Tamil actor, to Kannada cinema. The film was produced by N. M. Suresh and based on a Tamil short story written by Kalki.

The film released on 24 November 2006 to average and negative feedback from critics. The film eventually failed to live up to the initial hype and the director's reputation at the box-office. Despite the failure, the film won two Filmfare Awards in Best Actress and Best Lyricist categories. Noted violinist L. Subramaniam was hired to play violin bits in the film. The film premiered at International Film Festival of India upon release.

Plot 

Vanaja (Ramya) loves Shankar (Shaam), but he loves Bhavani (Rakshita), an actress from a travelling theatre group. When Bhavani turns him down, Shankar turns to alcohol and becomes a victim of a tragedy.

Cast 

 Ramya as Vanaja
 Rakshita as Bhavani
 Shaam as Shankar
 Girish Karnad as Krishnamurthy
 Bharathi Vishnuvardhan as Vanaja's mother 
 Avinash as Gowda
 Daisy Bopanna a Gowda's daughter
 Sharan as Subbu
 Harish Raj as Krishnamurthy's student
 Mandeep Roy
 Baby Amulya

Production 
Bangalore based Tamil actor Shaam was cast as the hero while the leading Kannada actresses Ramya and Rakshita were cast as the heroines. Kavitha Lankesh also admitted that the story was inspired from a Tamil short story penned by Kalki. The classical music notes that comes in the film scenes have been tuned by acclaimed violinist L. Subramaniam. Girish Karnad was cast as Ramya's father.

Soundtrack 
The music of the film was composed and lyrics written by K. Kalyan. The title track won him the Filmfare Award for Best Lyricist – Kannada for the year 2006.

Awards 
 Filmfare Awards South
 Best Actress – Ramya
 Best Lyricist – K. Kalyan
 South Indian Cinematographers Association
 Best Actress – Ramya

Release and reception 
A critic from Rediff gave the film a rating of one-and-half out of five stars and stated that "But halfway through Tananam Tananam, you realise Kavitha Lankesh has derailed the story, and nothing really works in favour of the film". A critic from The Hindu gave the film a negative review and cited that "nothing is right about Tananam Tananam". A critic from Sify opined that "Kavitha Lankesh, touted to be an intelligent director, this time falls flat with Thananam Thananam as the film lacks a new story and the film is lengthy and slow moving".

References

External links 

2000s Kannada-language films
2000s romantic musical films
2006 films
Adaptations of works by Kalki Krishnamurthy
Films based on short fiction
Films directed by Kavitha Lankesh
Films scored by K. Kalyan
Indian romantic musical films